Advaita Vedanta and Mahayana Buddhism share significant similarities. Those similarities have attracted Indian and Western scholars attention, and have also been criticised by concurring schools. The similarities have been interpreted as Buddhist influences on Advaita Vedanta, though some deny such influences, or see them as expressions of the same eternal truth.

Advaita Vedanta (IAST, ; ; literally, not-two) is the oldest extant sub-school of Vedanta – an orthodox (āstika) school of Hindu philosophy and religious practice. Advaita  (philosophy, world view, teaching) is one of the classic Indian paths to spiritual realization. It took shape with the writings of Gaudapada in the 6th century CE.

Buddhism is a religion and dharma that encompasses a variety of traditions, beliefs and spiritual practices based on teachings attributed to the Buddha (5th century BCE), but diversified since then in a wide variety of practices and traditions. Buddhism originated in India, from where it spread through much of Asia. It declined in India during the middle ages, after the rise of new forms of Hinduism, including Advaita Vedanta.

Buddhist influences
Advaita Vedānta and various other schools of Hindu philosophy share terminology and numerous doctrines with Mahayana Buddhism. The similarities between Advaita and Buddhism have attracted Indian and Western scholars attention. and have also been criticised by concurring schools. Scholarly views have historically and in modern times ranged from "Advaita and Buddhism are very different", to "Advaita and Buddhism absolutely coincide in their main tenets", to "after purifying Buddhism and Advaita of accidental or historically conditioned accretions, both systems can be safely regarded as an expression of one and the same eternal absolute truth."

Similarities
Advaita Vedānta and various other schools of Hindu philosophy share numerous terminology, doctrines and dialectical techniques with Buddhism. According to a 1918 paper by the Buddhism scholar O. Rozenberg, "a precise differentiation between Brahmanism and Buddhism is impossible to draw." Murti notices that "the ultimate goal" of Vedanta, Samkhya and Mahayana Buddhism is "remarkably similar"; while Advaita Vedanta postulates a "foundational self," "Mahayana Buddhism implicitly affirms the existence of a deep underlying reality behind all empirical manifestations in its conception of sunyata (the indeterminate, the void), or vijnapti-matrata (consciousness only), or tathata (thatness), or dharmata (noumenal reality)."

Both traditions hold that "the empirical world is transitory, a show of appearances", and both admit "degrees of truth or existence". Both traditions emphasize the human need for spiritual liberation (moksha, nirvana, kaivalya), however with different assumptions. According to Frank Whaling, the similarities between Advaita Vedānta and Buddhism are not limited to the terminology and some doctrines, but also includes practice. The monastic practices and monk tradition in Advaita are similar to those found in Buddhism.

Mahayana influences
The influence of Mahayana Buddhism on Advaita Vedānta has been significant. Sharma points out that the early commentators on the Brahma Sutras were all realists, or pantheist realists. He states that they were influenced by Buddhism much like how Upanishadic dialectical techniques significantly influenced Buddhists, particularly during the 5th-6th centuries CE when Buddhist thought developing in the Yogacara school. Eliot Deutsch and Rohit Dalvi state:

Von Glasenap states that there was a mutual influence between Vedanta and Buddhism. Dasgupta and Mohanta suggest that Buddhism and Shankara's Advaita Vedānta represent "different phases of development of the same non-dualistic metaphysics from the Upanishadic period to the time of Sankara."

The influence of Mahayana Buddhism on other religions and philosophies was not limited to Vedānta. Kalupahana notes that the Visuddhimagga of Theravada Buddhism tradition contains "some metaphysical speculations, such as those of the Sarvastivadins, the Sautrantikas, and even the Yogacarins".

Gauḍapāda 
According to Sarma, "to mistake him [Gauḍapāda] to be a hidden or open Buddhist is absurd". The doctrines of Gauḍapāda and Buddhism are totally opposed, states Murti:

Advaitins have traditionally challenged the Buddhist influence thesis.
The influence of Buddhist doctrines on Gauḍapāda has been a vexed question. Modern scholarship generally accepts that Gauḍapāda was influenced by Buddhism, at least in terms of using Buddhist terminology to explain his ideas, but adds that Gauḍapāda was a Vedantin and not a Buddhist. Gauḍapāda adopted some Buddhist terminology and borrowed its doctrines to his Vedantic goals, much like early Buddhism adopted Upanishadic terminology and borrowed its doctrines to Buddhist goals; both used pre-existing concepts and ideas to convey new meanings. While there is shared terminology, the Advaita doctrines of Gaudapada and Buddhism also show differences.

The influence of Mahayana on Advaita Vedanta, states Deutsch, goes back at least to Gauḍapāda, where he "clearly draws from Buddhist philosophical sources for many of his arguments and distinctions and even for the forms and imagery in which these arguments are cast much like how Buddhists had borrowed Vedic terminology.

According to Plott, the influence of Buddhism on Gauḍapāda is undeniable and to be expected. Gauḍapāda, in his Karikas text, uses the leading concepts and wording of Mahayana Buddhist school but, states John Plott, he reformulated them to the Upanishadic themes. Yet, according to Plott, this influence is to be expected:

According to Mahadevan, Gauḍapāda adopted Buddhist terminology and borrowed its doctrines to his Vedantic goals, much like early Buddhism adopted Upanishadic terminology and borrowed its doctrines to Buddhist goals; both used pre-existing concepts and ideas to convey new meanings. Gauḍapāda took over the Buddhist doctrines that ultimate reality is pure consciousness (vijñapti-mātra) and "that the nature of the world is the four-cornered negation, which is the structure of Māyā". Gauḍapāda also took over the Buddhist concept of ajāta from Nagarjuna's Madhyamaka philosophy, which uses the term anutpāda.

Michael Comans states Gauḍapāda, an early Vedantin, utilised some arguments and reasoning from Madhyamaka Buddhist texts by quoting them almost verbatim. However, Comans adds there is a fundamental difference between Buddhist thought and that of Gauḍapāda, in that Buddhism has as its philosophical basis the doctrine of Dependent Origination according to which "everything is without an essential nature (nissvabhava), and everything is empty of essential nature (svabhava-sunya)", while Gauḍapāda does not rely upon this central teaching of Buddhism at all, and therefore should not be considered a Buddhist. Gauḍapāda's Ajātivāda (doctrine of no-origination or non -creation) is an outcome of reasoning applied to an unchanging nondual reality according to which "there exists a Reality (sat) that is unborn (aja)" that has essential nature (svabhava) and this is the "eternal, undecaying Self, Brahman (Atman)". Thus, Gauḍapāda differs from Buddhist scholars such as Nagarjuna, states Comans, by accepting the premises and relying on the fundamental teaching of the Upanishads.

Gauḍapāda, states Raju, "wove Buddhist doctrines into a philosophy of the Māṇḍukya Upanisad, which was further developed by Shankara". Of particular interest is Chapter Four of Gauḍapāda's text Karika, in which according to Bhattacharya, two karikas refer to the Buddha and the term Asparśayoga is borrowed from Buddhism. According to Murti, "the conclusion is irresistible that Gauḍapāda, a Vedānta philosopher, is attempting an Advaitic interpretation of Vedānta in the light of the Madhyamika and Yogacara doctrines. He even freely quotes and appeals to them." However, adds Murti, the doctrines are unlike Buddhism. Chapter One, Two and Three are entirely Vedantin and founded on the Upanishads, with little Buddhist flavor. Further, state both Murti and King, no Vedānta scholars who followed Gauḍapāda ever quoted from Chapter Four, they only quote from the first three.

Shankara
Given the principal role attributed to Shankara in Advaita tradition, his works have been examined by scholars for similarities with Buddhism. Buddhism supporters have targeted Shankara, states Biderman, while his Hindu supporters state that "accusations" concerning explicit or implicit Buddhist influence are not relevant. Adi Shankara, states Natalia Isaeva, incorporated "into his own system a Buddhist notion of maya which had not been minutely elaborated in the Upanishads". According to Mudgal, Shankara's Advaita and the Buddhist Madhyamaka view of ultimate reality are compatible because they are both transcendental, indescribable, non-dual and only arrived at through a via negativa (neti neti). Mudgal concludes therefore that "the difference between Sunyavada (Mahayana) philosophy of Buddhism and Advaita philosophy of Hinduism may be a matter of emphasis, not of kind.

Similarly, there are many points of contact between Buddhism's Vijnanavada and Shankara's Advaita. According to Marxist historian S.N. Dasgupta,

Daniel Ingalls writes, "If we are to adopt a metaphysical and static view of philosophy there is little difference between Shankara and Vijnanavada Buddhism, so little, in fact that the whole discussion is fairly pointless. But if we try to think our way back into minds of philosophers whose works we read, there is a very real difference between the antagonists".

Mudgal additionally states that the Upanishadic and Buddhist currents of thought "developed separately and independently, opposed to one another, as the orthodox and heterodox, the thesis and antithesis, and a synthesis was attempted by the Advaitin Shankara".

According to Daniel Ingalls, the Japanese Buddhist scholarship has argued that Adi Shankara did not understand Buddhism.

Criticisms of concurring Hindu schools
Some Hindu scholars criticized Advaita for its Maya and non-theistic doctrinal similarities with Buddhism. Ramanuja, the founder of Vishishtadvaita Vedānta, accused Adi Shankara of being a Prachanna Bauddha, that is, a "crypto-Buddhist", and someone who was undermining theistic Bhakti devotionalism. The non-Advaita scholar Bhaskara of the Bhedabheda Vedānta tradition, similarly around 800 CE, accused Shankara's Advaita as "this despicable broken down Mayavada that has been chanted by the Mahayana Buddhists", and a school that is undermining the ritual duties set in Vedic orthodoxy.

Differences from Buddhism

Atman and anatta
The Advaita Vedānta tradition has historically rejected accusations of crypto-Buddhism highlighting their respective views on Atman, Anatta and Brahman.

Advaita Vedānta holds the premise, "Soul exists, and Soul (or self, Atman) is a self evident truth". Buddhism, in contrast, holds the premise, "Atman does not exist, and An-atman (or Anatta, non-self) is self evident". Chakravarthi Ram-Prasad gives a more nuanced view, stating that the Advaitins "assert a stable subjectivity, or a unity of consciousness through all the specific states of indivuated consciousness, but not an individual subject of consciousness [...] the Advaitins split immanent reflexivity from 'mineness'."

In Buddhism, Anatta (Pali, Sanskrit cognate An-atman) is the concept that in human beings and living creatures, there is no "eternal, essential and absolute something called a soul, self or atman". Buddhist philosophy rejects the concept and all doctrines associated with atman, call atman as illusion (maya), asserting instead the theory of "no-self" and "no-soul." Most schools of Buddhism, from its earliest days, have denied the existence of the "self, soul" in its core philosophical and ontological texts. In contrast to Advaita, which describes knowing one's own soul as identical with Brahman as the path to nirvana, in its soteriological themes Buddhism has defined nirvana as the state of a person who knows that he or she has "no self, no soul".

The Upanishadic inquiry fails to find an empirical correlate of the assumed Atman, but nevertheless assumes its existence, and Advaitins "reify consciousness as an eternal self." In contrast, the Buddhist inquiry "is satisfied with the empirical investigation which shows that no such Atman exists because there is no evidence" states Jayatilleke.

Yet, some Buddhist texts chronologically placed in the 1st millennium of common era, such as the Mahayana tradition's Tathāgatagarbha sūtras suggest self-like concepts, variously called Tathagatagarbha or Buddha nature. In modern era studies, scholars such as Wayman and Wayman state that these "self-like" concepts are neither self nor sentient being, nor soul, nor personality. Some scholars posit that the Tathagatagarbha Sutras were written to promote Buddhism to non-Buddhists.

Epistemology
The epistemological foundations of Buddhism and Advaita Vedānta are different. Buddhism accepts two valid means to reliable and correct knowledge – perception and inference, while Advaita Vedānta accepts six (described elsewhere in this article). However, some Buddhists in history, have argued that Buddhist scriptures are a reliable source of spiritual knowledge, corresponding to Advaita's Śabda pramana, however Buddhists have treated their scriptures as a form of inference method.

Ontology
Advaita Vedānta posits a substance ontology, an ontology which holds that underlying the change and impermanence of empirical reality is an unchanging and permanent absolute reality, like an eternal substance it calls Atman-Brahman. In its substance ontology, as like other philosophies, there exist a universal, particulars and specific properties and it is the interaction of particulars that create events and processes.

In contrast, Buddhism posits a process ontology, also called as "event ontology". According to the Buddhist thought, particularly after the rise of ancient Mahayana Buddhism scholarship, there is neither empirical nor absolute permanent reality and ontology can be explained as a process. There is a system of relations and interdependent phenomena (pratitya samutpada) in Buddhist ontology, but no stable persistent identities, no eternal universals nor particulars. Thought and memories are mental constructions and fluid processes without a real observer, personal agency or cognizer in Buddhism. In contrast, in Advaita Vedānta, like other schools of Hinduism, the concept of self (atman) is the real on-looker, personal agent and cognizer.

The Pali Abdhidhamma and Theravada Buddhism considered all existence as dhamma, and left the ontological questions about reality and the nature of dhamma unexplained.

According to Renard, Advaita's theory of three levels of reality is built on the two levels of reality found in the Madhyamika.

Shankara on Buddhism
A central concern for Shankara, in his objections against Buddhism, is what he perceives as nihilism of the Buddhists. Shankara states that there "must be something beyond cognition, namely a cognizer," which he asserts is the self-evident Atman or witness. Buddhism, according to Shankara, denies the cognizer. He also considers the notion of Brahman as pure knowledge and "the quintessence of positive reality."

The teachings in Brahma Sutras, states Shankara, differ from both the Buddhist realists and the Buddhist idealists. Shankara elaborates on these arguments against various schools of Buddhism, partly presenting refutations which were already standard in his time, and partly offering his own objections. Shankara's original contribution in explaining the difference between Advaita and Buddhism was his "argument for identity" and the "argument for the witness". In Shankara's view, the Buddhist are internally inconsistent in their theories, because "the reservoir-consciousness that [they] set up, being momentary, is no better than ordinary consciousness. Or, if [they] allow the reservoir-consciousness to be lasting, [they] destroy [their] theory of momentariness." In response to the idealists, he notes that their alaya-vijnana, or store-house consciousness, runs counter to the Buddhist theory of momentariness. With regard to the Sunyavada (Madhyamaka), Shankara states that "being contradictory to all valid means of knowledge, we have not thought worth while to refute" and "common sense (loka-vyavahara) cannot be denied without the discovery of some other truth".

Buddhist criticisms
A few Buddhist scholars made the opposite criticism in the medieval era toward their Buddhist opponents. In the sixth century AD, for example, the Mahayana Buddhist scholar Bhaviveka redefined Vedantic concepts to show how they fit into Madhyamaka concepts, and "equate[d] the Buddha's Dharma body with Brahman, the ultimate reality of the Upanishads." In his Madhyamakahṛdayakārikaḥ, Bhaviveka stages a Hinayana (Theravada) interlocutor, who accuses Mahayana Buddhists of being "crypto-Vedantins". Medieval era Tibetan Gelugpa scholars accused the Jonang school of being "crypto-Vedantist." Contemporary scholar David Kalupahana called the seventh century Buddhist scholar Chandrakirti a "crypto-Vedantist", a view rejected by scholars of Madhayamika Buddhism.

Notes

References

Sources

Printed sources

Web-sources

Advaita Vedanta
Buddhism and Hinduism
Āstika
Nāstika
Nondualism